A list of British films released in 2001.

See also
 2001 in film
 List of 2001 box office number-one films in the United Kingdom
 2001 in British music
 2001 in British radio
 2001 in British television
 2001 in the United Kingdom

References

External links

2000
Films
British